Chua Sock Koong is the former Group CEO of Singtel, a position she has held from April 2007 to December 2020.

Professional career
Appointed Group Chief Executive Officer in April 2007, Chua directed Singtel’s global strategy and oversees its consumer, enterprise and digital businesses. Before helming Singtel as Group CEO, Chua served in various key capacities within the company, most notably CEO International and Group CFO, after first joining as Treasurer in 1989. She was instrumental in the corporatisation of Singtel in 1992 and its subsequent successful listing on the Singapore Stock Exchange a year later. She also restructured and readied the company for competition in the lead up to the full liberalisation of the Singapore telecoms market in 2000. Faced with the realities of a small domestic market, Chua was part of the core leadership team which developed Singtel’s internationalisation strategy which accounts for the Group’s acquisition of Optus in Australia and a host of other regional telecom investments. As CEO International, she stepped up Singtel’s diversification across some of Asia’s fastest growing economies, leading and overseeing investments in India’s Bharti Airtel, Indonesia’s Telkomsel, Thailand’s AIS and Philippines’ Globe.

Digital Transformation
With the advent of the digital economy in recent years, she led Singtel’s transformation from a traditional telco into a communications technology company. This transformation has seen compelling growth in the new enterprise services of cloud and cyber security as well as the creation of new digital businesses in areas where Singtel’s telecom assets provide a competitive advantage.

External Boards & Appointments
In 2019, she became the first woman to join Singapore’s Council of Presidential Advisers when she was made an alternate member by President Halimah Yacob. She was appointed a full member of the council in 2020.

Chua is also the Deputy Chairman of the Public Service Commission in Singapore.

She was Deputy Chair of the GSMA Board from 2019 to 2020.

In 2023, she was named a member of the McKinsey & Company External Advisory Group.

Education
Chua completed her education at Raffles Girls School and Raffles Institution. Chua holds a Bachelor of Accountancy (First Class Honours) from the University of Singapore. She is a Fellow Member of the Institute of Singapore Chartered Accountants and a CFA charterholder.

References

Singaporean chief executives
Singaporean people of Chinese descent
Members of the Public Service Commission (Singapore)
1956 births
Living people
Women chief executives
Women chief financial officers
University of Singapore alumni
CFA charterholders
Raffles Institution alumni
Raffles Girls' Secondary School alumni